Benny E. Dobbins, aka Ben, Bernie, or Bennie Dobbins (November 16, 1932 – February 5, 1988) was an American stuntman, actor, stunt coordinator, and second unit director 

As coordinator and director, Dobbins is known for films such as Planes, Trains and Automobiles, The Running Man, Extreme Prejudice, Ferris Bueller's Day Off, Commando, and Weird Science. 

As a stuntman and actor Dobbins was frequently omitted from the end credits. Even in his credited work, he is often given generic character names such as Cowboy #2 in Gunsmoke (S17E21 "Yankton") and 1st Bandit in The Six Million Dollar Man (S1E12 "The Coward").

Dobbins died in Austria after suffering a heart attack near the ski resort of Schladming during the filming of Red Heat starring Arnold Schwarzenegger. Dobbins was a co-director on the film, and was coordinating the stunts when he collapsed. He was airlifted from the film location by helicopter to a hospital where, later, a doctor pronounced him dead.

Filmography
A partial filmography follows.

Stuntman
 Commando (1985)
 E.T. the Extra-Terrestrial (1982) 
 Blazing Saddles (1974)
 Earthquake (1974)
 Cheyenne (1958-1962)

Director, Stunt Coordinator
 Red Heat (1988)
 Planes, Trains and Automobiles (1987)
 The Running Man (1987)
 Extreme Prejudice (1987)
 Ferris Bueller's Day Off (1986)
 Commando (1985)
 Weird Science (1985)

Actor
 Gunsmoke (1972) as Cowboy #2 (S17E21 "Yankton")
 The Six Million Dollar Man (1974) as 1st Bandit (S1E12 "The Coward")

References

External links

 AllMovie: https://www.allmovie.com/artist/bennie-e-dobbins-p87915

1932 births
1988 deaths
American stunt performers
American male film actors
American male television actors
20th-century American male actors